Kevin O'Sullivan (born 1974) is an Irish hurler who played as a goalkeeper for the Tipperary senior team.

O'Sullivan joined the team during the 1996 championship and was a regular member of the team for just two seasons. An All-Ireland medalist as a non-playing substitute in the under-21 grade, he failed to claim any honours at senior level.

At club level O'Sullivan plays with Cashel King Cormacs club.

References

1971 births
Living people
Cashel King Cormac's hurlers
Tipperary inter-county hurlers